Aaron Tozer (born 1788, died 1854) was a captain in the Royal Navy.

Life
Tozer was born in 1788. He entered the Navy in June 1801 on board , with Captain Thomas Baker, on the Irish station. Tozer was dangerously wounded in the shoulder, and, after passing his examination, was specially promoted to be lieutenant on 11 August 1807.

On 18 August 1813 in an attack, in force, on the batteries of Cassis, when the citadel battery was carried by escalade and three gunboats and twenty-four merchant vessels were brought out. Tozer was severely wounded by a canister shot in the groin and by a musket shot in the left hand. In consequence of these wounds he was invalided; on 15 July 1814 was promoted to commander, and in December 1815 awarded a pension of £150 a year. From 1818 to 1822 he commanded  in the West Indies; in 1829 the yacht .

On 14 January 1830 he was promoted to post rank, but had no further employment. He died in Plymouth on 21 February 1854.

Family
In June 1827 he married Mary, eldest daughter of Henry Hutton of Lincoln, and had one son, the Rev. Henry Fanshawe Tozer, fellow of Exeter College, Oxford.

References

DNB references
These references are found in the DNB article referred to above.

External links
 
 

1788 births
1854 deaths
Royal Navy officers
Royal Navy personnel of the Napoleonic Wars